The Acrochordidae, commonly known as wart snakes, Java wart snakes, file snakes, elephant trunk snakes, or dogface snakes are a monogeneric family created for the genus Acrochordus. This is a group of basal aquatic snakes found in Australia and tropical Asia. Currently, three species are recognized.

Description

All are entirely aquatic, lacking the broad belly-scales found in most other snakes and possessing dorsally located eyes. Their most notable feature is their skin and scales. The skin is loose and baggy, giving the impression of being several sizes too large for the snake, and the scales, rather than overlapping, are tiny pyramidal projections that led to their common names.

These snakes are ambush predators, lurking at the bottom of rivers, streams and estuaries, and waiting for fish to approach, which they grip with their coils. The rough scales allow them to hold the fish despite the mucus coating. Adults grow to between 60 cm and 2.43 m in length.

Geographic range
Found from western India and Sri Lanka through tropical Southeast Asia to the Philippines, south through the Indonesian island group to Timor, east through New Guinea to the northern coast of Australia to Mussau Island, the Bismarck Archipelago and Guadalcanal Island in the Solomon Islands.

Commercial exploitation
These animals are rapidly becoming rare as their hides are used for handbags and leather (stripped of scales, of course).  Numerous attempts have been made by both zoos and private reptile collectors to keep them, but in all cases, they have been reluctant to feed and prone to skin infections.

Taxonomy
There are many synonyms for the family Acrochordidae including: Acrochordina Bonaparte, 1831, Acrochordidae Bonaparte, 1840, Acrochorniens A.M.C. Duméril, 1853, Acrochordidae Jan, 1863, Acrochordinae Boulenger, 1893, Acrochordoidae McDowell, 1975,  Acrochordini Dowling & Duellman, 1978

There are also many synonyms for the genera Acrochordus including:  Acrochordus Hornstedt, 1787, Chersydrus Cuvier, 1817, Chersidrus Oken, 1817, Acrochordus Gray, 1825, Chersydreas Gray, 1825, Chershydrus Bonaparte, 1831, Verrucator Schlegel, 1837, Chersydraeas Gray, 1849, Potamophis Schmidt, 1852, Chersydraeus Duméril, Bibron & Duméril, 1854, Acrochordus Boulenger, 1893

Species

References

External links

 
 Acrochordus.com. Accessed 3 November 2008.
 Acrochordids at Life is Short but Snakes are Long

Acrochordidae
Snake genera